Khyuryak is a rural locality (a selo) in Burgankentsky Selsoviet, Tabasaransky District, Republic of Dagestan, Russia. The population was 420 as of 2010. There are 5 streets.

Geography 
Khyuryak is located 22 km southeast of Khuchni (the district's administrative centre) by road. Burgankent is the nearest rural locality.

References 

Rural localities in Tabasaransky District